The 1938 Virginia Cavaliers football team represented the University of Virginia during the 1938 college football season. The Cavaliers were led by second-year head coach Frank Murray and played their home games at Scott Stadium in Charlottesville, Virginia. They competed as independents, finishing with a record of 4–4–1.

Schedule

References

Virginia
Virginia Cavaliers football seasons
Virginia Cavaliers football